Chol Qeshlaqi (also Romanized as Chol Qeshlāqī; also known as Chol Qeshlāq, Chowl Qeshlāqī, Chūl Qeshlāq, and Chūl Qeshlāqī) is a village in Qeshlaq Rural District, in the Central District of Ahar County, East Azerbaijan Province, Iran. At the 2006 census, its population was 973, in 197 families.

References 

Populated places in Ahar County